The "Little Nine" is a  family car produced by the British Standard Motor Company between 1930 and 1933. It was the smallest in the range of cars offered by the company in the early-1930s, appearing some two years after the demise, in 1929, of the  Standard Teignmouth. The car was relatively expensive compared to its peers but became popular among the upper echelons of society.

The 1,005 cc side-valve engine was replaced three years after launch, in 1934, when the bore was extended. The slightly larger unit now displaced 1,052 cc.

The car was made in Saloon form and a few 2-door convertibles were made on special order, making them extremely rare.

In 1936 production came to an end and the car was replaced by the more streamlined and wider Flying Nine model.

References

External links
Standard Motor Club
Standard Flying Eight Tourer Site

Little Nine
Cars introduced in 1931

de:Standard Nine#Little Nine (1933-1936)